Karvan-e Sofla Rural District is a rural district (dehestan) in Karvan District, Tiran and Karvan County, Isfahan Province, Iran. At the 2006 census, its population was 18,066, in 4,876 families.  The rural district has 16 villages.

References 

Rural Districts of Isfahan Province
Tiran and Karvan County